The Denver City Council is the legislative branch of government for the City and County of Denver, Colorado. The council is made up of thirteen elected officials from eleven City and county designated districts and two at-large elected members. Although the offices are officially non-partisan, the members are allowed to be affiliated with a political party. Most commonly in Denver history, members are almost always members of the Democratic Party. Elections for all members are held every four years, the next being in 2023. The council elects a president to serve as a leader annually.

Members
The current city council members are:
 Dist 1 – Amanda Sandoval 
 Dist 2 – Kevin Flynn
 Dist 3 – Jamie Torres 
 Dist 4 – Kendra Black 
 Dist 5 – Amanda Sawyer
 Dist 6 – Paul Kashmann 
 Dist 7 – Jolon Clark  
 Dist 8 – Christopher Herndon
 Dist 9 – Candi CdeBaca
 Dist 10 – Christopher Hinds
 Dist 11 – Stacie Gilmore
 At-Large – Debbie Ortega
 At-Large – Robin Kniech

See also
Denver
Colorado
Law and Government of Colorado

External links
The City and County of Denver
The City Council Webpage
Alphabetical List of Past and Present Denver City Council Members (incomplete)
Denver City Council District Maps 1950s–2010

Government of Denver
City councils in the United States